Serupepeli Tuvula (born c. 1963 in Nadi) is a Fijian former rugby union footballer, he played as wing.

Career
His first international cap for Fiji was during a mach against Australia, at Sydney, on 17 August 1985.
Tuvula also played in the 1987 Rugby World Cup, playing 3 matches, with the match against Italy at Dunedin, on 31 May 1987 being his last international cap. At club level, He played for Nadi in the Farebrother Cup, and later, he played for Queensland.

Notes

External links
 

Fiji international rugby union players
Fijian rugby union players
Rugby union wings
1963 births
Fijian expatriates in Australia
Sportspeople from Nadi
Living people
I-Taukei Fijian people